Pontrhydyrun Halt railway station was a railway halt which served the village of Pontrhydyrun near Cwmbran in Torfaen, South Wales, UK.

History
The station was opened by the Great Western Railway on 17 July 1933 on its line from Pontypool to Newport. It closed on 30 April 1962.

The 2 platform request halt lay along the current A4051 road, Cwmbran Drive, which largely follows the trackbed of the Monmouthshire Railway's Eastern Valley line.

References

Notes

Sources

External links
Pictures and local information
Picture of first station building remains in 2012
Station on a navigable 1947 O.S. map

Disused railway stations in Torfaen
Railway stations in Great Britain opened in 1933
Railway stations in Great Britain closed in 1962
Former Great Western Railway stations
1933 establishments in Wales
1962 disestablishments in Wales